The 2014 Scandinavian Touring Car Championship season was the fourth Scandinavian Touring Car Championship season. The season started at Ring Knutstorp on 10 May and ended on 20 September at Mantorp Park, after six double-header rounds. It was the second year of TTA – Racing Elite League silhouette regulations in the series following the merge of the STCC and TTA at the end of the 2012 season. Thed Björk entered the season as the series' defending champion.

Björk won his second consecutive title, after winning three races during the season; he also achieved three pole positions which were the equivalent of three further race victories, as points were awarded on the same scale for qualifying as the races. Björk finished 33 points clear of his nearest rival, Fredrik Larsson, who achieved a single race victory at Mantorp Park, as well as a pole position at the first Knutstorp meeting. Third place in the championship went to Fredrik Ekblom, who like his team-mate Björk, achieved three race victories, but with one pole position fewer. Other race victories were taken by Philip Forsman (two wins), Mattias Lindberg, Andreas Wernersson and Erik Jonsson. Volvo Polestar Racing won the teams' championship by almost 100 points ahead of the WestCoast Racing/BMW Dealer Team.

Teams and drivers
All teams were Swedish-registered.

Race calendar and results
All rounds were held in Sweden.

Championship standings

Drivers' Championship

Teams'Championship

References

External links
 

2014 in motorsport
2014 in Swedish motorsport